Union Special (Union Special Machine Company) is an American industrial sewing machine company based in Huntley, Illinois, and is one of the oldest remaining sewing machine companies. The company opened its current factory, which was formerly a Borden milk factory, in 1948.

See also
 List of sewing machine brands

References

External links
 Official website

American brands
Sewing machine brands